Dynamin Superfamily Protein (DSP) is a protein superfamily includes classical dynamins, GBPs, Mx proteins, OPA1, mitofusins in Eukaryote, and bacterial dynamin-like proteins (BDLPs) in Prokaryote. DSPs mediate eukaryotic membrane fusion and fission necessary for endocytosis, organelle biogenesis and maintenance, Mitochondrial fusion and fission, as well as for prokaryotic cytokinesis.

Structure 
All DSPs have two common domains: a GTPase domain and an elongated α-helical bundle domain.

References

External links 

Cellular processes
EC 3.6.5